La Ballade des Dalton (aka The Ballad of the Daltons in English) is a 1978 French animated film written and directed by René Goscinny, Morris, Henri Gruel and Pierre Watrin starring the comic book character Lucky Luke. Two different adaptations of the film in book form were both published in French in 1978. The first, adapted by Guy Vidal, was in text form rather than comic strip, and was accompanied by images from the film. The second was a comic strip adaptation by an uncredited Pascal Dabère and formed part of the book, La Ballade des Dalton et autres histoires (The Ballad of the Daltons and Other Stories).

Plot
The story opens in a Western saloon, where a young musician with a banjo begins to tell a tale of Lucky Luke and his sworn enemies, the Dalton brothers: Joe, William, Jack, and Averell. Luke has, once again, as he has done many times before, thrown the four outlaws into jail. The prison is also the abode of a guard dog named Rin Tin Can (Rantanplan in the original French language version).

No sooner have the Daltons entered the jail than they are met by a lawyer named Augustus Betting. Betting informs the brothers that their Uncle Henry Dalton has died by hanging. However, throughout his criminal career, Henry Dalton amassed quite a fortune, and has chosen to leave it all to his nephews on the condition that they kill the judge and jury who sentenced him to death. To make sure that the task is completed, Henry Dalton states in his will that his nephews must be accompanied by the only honest man that he has ever known, Lucky Luke. If the task is not successfully completed, the entire fortune will instead be given to charity.

The brothers then decide to tunnel out of the jail, but end up digging into the dynamite storage building. When Averell lights a match, the building blows up. The Daltons, along with Rin Tin Can, are blown far away from the remains of the jail. Their disappearance, along with Rin Tin Can leads the prison officers to believe the Daltons are now dead.

When Rin Tin Can recovers from the explosion, he assumes that the prison was stolen, and upon seeing only the Dalton brothers nearby, suspects them. He then follows them on their journey to find Lucky Luke. The brothers first hold up a travelling hardware merchant. When the merchant (Tobias Willis) stops at the nearest town, Lucky Luke overhears his talk, confirming that the Daltons are indeed alive.

Luke heads out to find the Daltons, who offer to make a deal with him. If he refuses to help them, they will kill him. If he accepts, he gets a share of the inheritance (a ruse by the Daltons, who plan to still kill Luke if he helps them). Luke agrees to help supervise the killings and offers to help kill the judge and jury as well. However, he reveals to his horse, Jolly Jumper, and the audience, that he was only attempting to deceive the Dalton brothers when he said that.

Luke and the Daltons then cross the plains in search of the judge and jury. However, every time they find one of their intended victims, Luke manages to play some trick on the Daltons so that they believe their target has been killed.

Once they believe their task is done, the Daltons and Luke head off to meet Augustus Betting. However, also waiting for them are the judge and jury they thought had been killed. The Dalton brothers are accused of attempted murder, and with Luke having witnessed their intentions, the jury that had found Henry Dalton guilty, now finds his nephews guilty as well. Angered by the unraveling of his scheme, Joe attempts to escapes, but is caught by Jolly Jumper.

The Daltons are returned to the prison, along with Rin Tin Can. Henry Dalton's fortune is then given away to charity.

Characters 
Lucky Luke – A cowboy who can shoot faster than his own shadow. One of the most respected cowboys on the plains.

Henry Dalton – Deceased uncle to The Dalton Brothers. Amassed a fortune from his life of crime. Was found guilty and hanged for his crimes.

Ming Li Foo – A Chinese laundryman who runs a laundry in Grass City.

Sam Game – A former notorious gambler, who has become a clergyman (although he still uses gambling terms in his sermons). He runs his own church with a congregation, made up entirely of elderly women.

Thadeus Collins – The warden of a jail, whose entire prison population has tunnelled out to freedom. Collins thought of his prisoners as his children, and their 'abandonment' leaves him in great anguish.

Steve Bugman – A train driver.

Snake Feather – (Plume de Serpent in the original French language version.) A Native American witch doctor.

Dr. Aldous Smith – A travelling quack doctor who claims to be in possession of a cure-all miracle elixir. The character's appearance is modelled after the American actor, W.C. Fields.

Mathias Bones – An undertaker, usually accompanied by a vulture, who is constantly looking out for his next customer. The appearance of this character is modelled on that of the actor, Boris Karloff.

Tom O'Connor – An old miner who supposedly disappeared into his gold mine, and is presumed dead.

Published versions

There have been several books based on the film.

In 1978, a 60-page large-format book was published with the history of the film in the form of a text written by Guy Vidal and illustrated with images from the film. This book was reissued in 1981 in album format as part of the standard series (T17 La Ballade des Dalton).

Also in that year, La Ballade des Dalton was adapted as a comic strip in the 16/22 collection by Dargaud. The artwork is by Pascal Dabère (uncredited). The comic book was reissued in album format in 1986 and became part of the standard series (T25 La Ballade des Dalton et autres histoires).

It is the last album of the series written by Goscinny.

Album references
Jury member #1: The character Ming Li Foo first appeared in Le Vingtième de cavalerie. A character with the same name but a slightly different appearance played a minor part in the previous film Daisy Town from 1971.

Jury member #2: The jail warden thinks and behaves similarly to the jail warden in La Guérison des Dalton.

Jury member #3: Similar psychedelics to those encountered with meeting Snake Feather can be seen in L'Héritage de Rantanplan.

Jury member #4: The quack doctor who looks like W.C. Fields appeared as a circus manager in Western Circus.

Jury member #5: The old miner looks and behaves like the old miner in La Ville fantôme.

Jury member #6: A friend of the gambler in La Diligence, called Sam Spade, looks exactly like Sam Game.

Jury member #7: The scene where the Daltons derail a train, which consequently runs through the scenery and ends up in a town, is taken from Jesse James.

Jury member #8: The undertaker Mathias Bones was a central character in the 1971 film but made his first appearance in the Lucky Luke album Les Rivaux de Painful Gulch.

Judge: The visual jokes from the rodeo sequences are based on jokes from the album Rodéo. The judge, who also appeared in the 1971 film, looks like the judge in Billy the Kid.

References
The scenes in the Dalton musical comedy dream pays homage to the golden age of musical films and included references (i.e. Singin' in the Rain, White Christmas, Bathing Beauty, Ziegfeld Follies and performer Busby Berkley). Frank Sinatra's 1966 song Strangers in the Night was referenced in the dream.

A caricature of Serge Gainsbourg is the pianist accompanying Bill in the opening sequence. One of the portraits in Collins' office is a caricature of Pierre Tchernia as a prisoner being led away by police guards.

Trivia
This is the first movie where Lucky Luke's horse Jolly Jumper is seen talking, much like in the original comic books and in fact is voiced by the series' writer René Goscinny in the French version. Rin Tin Can made its appearance in the film for the first time.
In November 1977, René Goscinny died while the film was almost finished. All that was missing was the scene where the Daltons dance and sing to Singin' in the Rain. On November 4, 1977, the day before his death, Goscinny attended a work session at the Studios Idéfix on the film project. While examining a series of proofs and drawings, he gave his opinion on this or that point to be revised, for example, Averell Dalton's chin and Jolly Jumper's saddle. The last session, which was audio recorded for the purposes of the planned retouching, is the last recorded testimony of Goscinny's life. For the first time, the public was able to listen to the complete recording during the Goscinny and the Cinema exhibition at the Cinémathèque française in 2017-2018.
This is the last animated feature film produced and developed by Studios Idéfix before their closure.

Cast

English Version
Script Adaptation and Dubbing Director: Martin Rosen

Additional Voices
G. Grimm

Sources

External links

Lucky Luke official site album index 
Goscinny website on Lucky Luke 

1978 films
1978 Western (genre) films
French Western (genre) films
Western (genre) animated films
1978 animated films
1978 graphic novels
1970s French animated films
Animated films based on comics
Comics by Morris (cartoonist)
Cultural depictions of W. C. Fields
Films adapted into comics
Films directed by René Goscinny
French animated films
French children's films
Lucky Luke albums
Lucky Luke films
Works by René Goscinny
1970s French-language films
Films directed by Morris (cartoonist)
Films with screenplays by Pierre Tchernia
Films scored by Claude Bolling
Films about inheritances
Films about prison escapes
1970s English-language films